The Union for a New Burkina (UBN) is a political party in Burkina Faso.

History
The UBN was formed on 14 February 2015, based on an association established in 2011 following the 2011 Burkinabé protests. Former Minister of Sport Yacouba Ouédraogo was appointed party president. In the 2015 general elections it received 0.86% of the vote, winning one of the constituency seats (Ag Amlaouna Agali in Oudalan Province).

References

2015 establishments in Burkina Faso
Political parties established in 2015
Political parties in Burkina Faso